was a Japanese politician. A member of the Democratic Party of Japan, he served in the House of Councillors from 1998 to 2004.

Honda died on 22 July 2022, at the age of 82.

References

1940 births
2022 deaths
Liberal Democratic Party (Japan) politicians
Social Democratic Party (Japan) politicians
Democratic Party of Japan politicians
Your Party politicians
People from Kumamoto Prefecture